The Manjara, also spelled Manjara or Manjeera, is a tributary of the river Godavari. It passes through the states of Maharashtra, Karnataka and Telangana. It originates in the Balaghat range of hills near Ahmednagar district at an altitude of 823 metres (2,700 ft) and empties into the Godavari River.

Description 
The river's origin is near the Gavalwadi Village of Beed district. The river flows from the northern boundaries of the Osmanabad district and cutting across the Latur district goes to the Bidar district in Karnataka State and finally Telangana. It flows on the Balaghat plateau along with its tributaries: Terna, Tawarja and Gharni. The other three tributaries of Manjara are Manyad, Teru and Lendi which flow on the northern plains.

Manjira River, in the first two third of its length generally flows from west to east direction, until Sanga Reddy town in Telangana, little northerly to which it changes its course and flows north. Final stretch of the River forms the border between Maharashtra to the West and Telangana to the East. Manjira River along with River Haridra merges with mighty River Godavari at the border, with Dharmabad of Maharashtra, westerly and Kandakurthi south-easterly in Telangana. This triveni sangam is sacred for Hindus. The famous sacred Sri Gnana Saraswathi Devasthanam in Basar, Nirmal district, Telangana is located little downstream along River Godavari.

Tributaries 

 Terna River: This is the main tributary of Manjara which flows on the southern boundary of the Ausa taluka .
 Manyad: This river takes its origin at Dharmapuri in Beed district and flows through the Ahmadpur taluka in Latur district.
 Lendi: The river has its origin in Udgir taluka and flowing through the Ahmadpur taluka joins the Tiru river in Nanded district .
 Gharni: The river has its origin near Wadval and flows through Chakur taluka.
 Tawarja: Tawarja originates near Murud in Latur taluka and joins the Manjara river at Shivani on the Latur-Ausa boundary.

Buildings 
Morgi is a village with a population of 1015. It is located in Medak state on the boundary between Karnataka and Telangana with the river Manjeera separating them. The Manjeera is the major water source here for the villagers. Farming is the major occupation and it is also a deer reservoir area.

The Singur Dam on Manjra River in Medak District is the main drinking water source for the Medak and Nizamabad districts as well as the adjoining twin cities of Hyderabad and Secunderabad. Manjra river is also serving for Bidar city.

The Nizam Sagar Dam was constructed across the Manjra River between Achampeta and Banjapalle villages of the Nizamabad district in Telangana, India. The most outstanding feature of the project is the gigantic masonry dam sprawling across the river for 3 kilometers with a motorable road of 15 feet width.

Notes 
The Manjira is also called the Manjara river in Maharashtra.

In the late 20th and early 21st centuries the upper reaches of the Manjira in Maharashtra suffered environmental degradation which increased run-off, as opposed to ground water recharge, and increased erosion and silting.

References

Rivers of Telangana
Rivers of Karnataka
Rivers of Maharashtra
Tributaries of the Godavari River
Rivers of India